Jeffry A. House (born December 29, 1946) is a retired lawyer who practiced in Toronto, Ontario, Canada.  He is best known for his efforts on behalf and representation of fugitive American soldiers and Indigenous protesters.

American soldiers

House has represented American soldiers applying for refugee status in Canada after they deserted the American military during the Iraq War, including Jeremy Hinzman, Josh Key, Kyle Snyder, and Brandon Hughey.  The cases of Jeremy Hinzman and Brandon Hughey have been heard and rejected by the Immigration and Refugee Board of Canada, refused at the Federal Court of Canada, refused at the Federal Court of Appeal, and refused at the Supreme Court of Canada. 

The presence of US Army deserters in Canada was widely reported in the international news media, as well as in Canada and in the United States. During the Vietnam War, upwards of 50,000 U.S. draft evaders and military deserters found refuge in Canada.

Indigenous protesters
House has represented Indigenous protesters involved in the Ipperwash Crisis in Ipperwash Provincial Park, Ontario in 1995, especially Nick Cottrelle and Warren George, with the matter ending in an acquittal of the accused.

Biography
Jeffry House grew up in Milwaukee, Wisconsin. After a year as an exchange student in Norway, he graduated from the University of Wisconsin–Madison in 1969. House was drafted into the US Armed Forces during the Vietnam War. In January 1970, House evaded the military draft and moved to Canada. 

House received a master's degree in Political Theory from York University and a Law Degree from the Osgoode Hall Law School in Toronto, Ontario, Canada. He practiced law for four decades. For six years, House served on the quasi-judicial tribunal enforcing the Ontario Human Rights Code. His decisions involve an early gay rights case in which spousal benefits were awarded to same sex partners (Clinton & Mercaz), and the Northwestern General Hospital case, where Crown disclosure obligation was held to apply in Human Rights cases. 

In 1991, House was counsel on the Osborne decision in the Supreme Court of Canada which struck down the law which prevented public employees from participating in after-work political activities.

Sources
 "UW grad in Canada aids deserter", The Capital Times
 "U.S. war objectors are seeking sanctuary in Canada: What will be their fate?", Refusing to Kill
 Jeffry A. House's lawfirm's website
 Breaking Ranks documentary website
 "Breaking Ranks", Mother Jones
 "Jeremy Hinzman leads way for US war resisters in Canada", Not In Our Name
 Federal Court to review US military deserter case, CBC
 "No refugee status in Canada for U.S. soldier", CBC
 "Judge to review case of war dodger", CBC
 "Canada refuses 'refugee' from the U.S.", CBC
 "U.S. army deserter claims refugee status in Toronto, Ontario", CTV
 "U.S. army deserter loses bid for refugee status", CTV
 "Army deserter plans next move to stay in Canada", CTV
 "U.S. war dodger may become prisoner of conscience", CTV
 "Court to review U.S. war dodger's asylum claim", CTV
 "U.S. war deserter tells refugee board of atrocities", CTV
 "Judge rejects claims of U.S. deserters", CanWest News Service
 "U.S. war dodgers to appeal Federal Court ruling", Canada Press
 "U.S. war dodgers will appeal refugee ruling: lawyer", Canada Press;
 "Asylum Denied To Army Deserter", CBS News – 60 Minutes II
 "Deserters: We Won't Go To Iraq; U.S. Soldiers Seeking Refuge In Canada May Face Serious Penalties", CBS News – 60 Minutes II
 "Lawyer for US deserters speaks with WSWS", World Socialist Web Site
 "From Vietnam to Iraq: American War Resisters Seek Refuge in Canada", Democracy Now
 "Will War Deserters Find Asylum in Canada?", Wall Street Journal
 "Perspectives", Newsweek
 "War Resisters Go North", The Nation
 "Canada denies refugee status to U.S. soldier c Blow to American antiwar movement", MSNBC
 "An Illegal, Immoral Order – an American soldier explains why he is refusing to fight in Iraq", MSNBC
 Activism Online; U.S. War Resisters In Canada
 JeremyHinzman.net – website partnership between Hinzman and his various supporters
  "US deserter denied Canada asylum", BBC
 "Canada denies asylum to Army deserter", The Seattle Times
 "Refugee or deserter?", Christian Science Monitor
 "Canada's romance with US military exiles", Christian Science Monitor
 "You wouldn’t catch me dead in Iraq", The Times Online (UK)
 "Un Américain qui a fait la guerre en Irak réclame le statut de réfugié", Le Soleil
 "La Cour fédérale entendra la requête d'un déserteur américain", Le Soleil

See also
 Canada and Iraq War resisters
 Indigenous peoples
 List of anti-war organizations
 List of Iraq War resisters
 Nuremberg Principles
 Nuremberg Principles, successes and failures in preserving the Principles, Canada

Further reading
 Amnesty International Report; Canada: Why there must be a public enquiry into the police killing of Dudley George 
 One Dead Indian: The Premier, the Police, and the Ipperwash Crisis by Peter Edwards;

Audio and video resources
 Canadian Broadcasting Corporation "Digital Archives" – Seeking Sanctuary: Draft Dodgers
 National Film Board of Canada – Breaking Ranks; The Documentary

External links
 Manual for Draft-Age Immigrants to Canada
 US Draft Resistance Resources
 War Resisters in Canada – online bibliography
 War Resisters Support Campaign in Canada

Living people
1946 births
Lawyers in Ontario
Lawyers from Milwaukee
American emigrants to Canada
Vietnam War draft evaders
Desertion
University of Wisconsin–Madison alumni